Los Pinos is the official residence and office of the President of Mexico. 

Los Pinos may also refer to:

 Los Pinos Airstrip, in Baja California, Mexico
 Los Pinos, New Mexico, a ghost town in the US
 Los Pinos, Uruguay, a village

See also
 Os Pinos, the official anthem of Galicia, Spain
 Pinos (disambiguation)